Elspeth or Elspet is a feminine given name, which is the Scottish form of Elizabeth.
It means "chosen by God" or "consecrated by God". 

The name may refer to:

People
Elspeth Attwooll (born 1943), English politician
Elspeth Ballantyne (born 1939), Australian actress
Elspeth Barker (1940–2022), Scottish writer
Elspeth Beard (born 1959), English motorcyclist
Elspeth Buchan (1738–1791), Scottish religious leader
Elspeth Cameron (born 1943), Canadian writer
Elspeth Campbell (born 1940), English political spouse
Elspeth Champcommunal (1888–1976), English fashion designer and editor 
Elspeth Denning (born 1956), Australian field hockey player
Elspeth Duxbury (1909–1967) English actress
Elspeth Eric (1907-1993), American actress
Elspeth Garman (born 1955), English scientist
Elspeth Gibson (born 1963), English fashion designer
Elspeth R. M. Dusinberre (1968), American professor of classics
Elspet Gray (1929–2013), Scottish actress
Elspeth Hanson (born 1986), English musician
Elspeth Howe (1932–2022), English public servant
Elspeth Huxley (1907–1997), Kenyan writer
Elspeth Kennedy (1921–2006), English scholar
Elspeth March (1911–1999), English actress
Elspeth McLachlan (born 1942), Australian scientist
Elspeth Probyn (born 1958), Australian writer
Elspeth Reoch (died 1616), alleged Scottish witch
Elspeth Rostow (1917–2007), American educator
Elspeth Sandys (born 1940), New Zealand author
Elspeth Thompson (1961–2010), English journalist

Fiction
Elspeth, a fictional character in the Evil Genius series by Catherine Jinks
Elspeth, a fictional apprentice sorceress in the animated television series Gawayn
Elspeth, a fictional character in Rewrite: Loops in the Timescape by Gregory Benford
Elspeth Cary, fictional character in The Day of the Triffids by John Wyndham
Elspeth Gordie, fictional character in Obernewtyn Chronicles by Isobelle Carmody
Elspeth Honey, fictional character in No Highway by Nevil Shute
Elspeth MacLeod, fictional character in Remembering Laughter by Wallace Stegner
Elspat MacTavish, fictional character in  The Highland Widow by Walter Scott
Elspeth McGillicuddy, fictional character in 4.50 from Paddington by Agatha Christie
Elspeth Morrison-Flashman, fictional character in The Flashman Papers by George McDonald Fraser
Elspeth Noblin, fictional character in Her Fearful Symmetry by Audrey Niffenegger
Elspeth Tirel, fictional character in the trading card game Magic: The Gathering
Elspeth MacTout, fictional character from The Family-Ness
Princess Elspeth, fictional character in several Valdemar novels by Mercedes Lackey
Saint Elspeth, fictional character in the computer game RuneScape
Lady Elspeth Tsepish, fictional character in the game King's Quest VII: The Princeless Bride
Elspeth Scallon, aka Sister Cecily in the book In This House of Brede by Rumer Godden
Elspeth, a fictional character (a witch and mother of Zora) in W.E.B. Du Bois's The Quest of the Silver Fleece

See also
Elspeth (band), an Irish rock band

References

Given names
Scottish feminine given names